Smart Studios was a recording studio located in Madison, Wisconsin. It was set up in 1983 by Butch Vig and Steve Marker to produce local bands. The studio produced bands such as Killdozer, The Smashing Pumpkins, L7, Tad, and Nirvana. After initial production and remix successes, the building became the focus of operations for Vig and Marker's own band, Garbage, who released their debut album in 1995.

The studio survived various mishaps, including flooding, and in 2003, a backhoe crashing through the walls of the downstairs studio. On May 1, 2010, the studio closed its doors because of financial difficulties, although in September 2013, producer and musician Brian Liston re-opened the former Smart Studios facility as Clutch Sound.

Madison filmmaker Wendy Schneider made a documentary on Smart Studios, The Smart Studios Story (2016), in which she interviewed artists, record producers, and engineers who worked in the facility. In 2012, the Wisconsin Historical Museum assembled an exhibit on the studio, Smart Sounds, Alt Music, Mad Scenes.

Selected list of albums recorded/mixed at Smart Studios 

Gary Sohmers' Windjammer: Dinosaur Rock - 1983
Killdozer: Intellectuals are the Shoeshine Boys of the Ruling Elite  -1984
The Mess: "It's All Wyrd"-1984
Juvenile Truth: no enemy
Killdozer: Snake Boy - 1985
The Mess: "Untitled"-1985
The Crucifucks: Wisconsin - 1986
The Rousers: In Without Knocking  - 1986
Snowcake: Strangled/SceneZine EP - 1987
Killdozer: Little Baby Buntin''' - 1988
Tar Babies: Honey Bubble - 1988-1989
Laughing Hyenas: You Can't Pray a Lie - 1989
Die Kreuzen: Gone Away EP - 1989
Killdozer: Twelve Point Buck - 1989
Nirvana: Nevermind – 1990 ("Polly")
King Snake Roost: Ground Into the Dirt - 1990
Laughing Hyenas: Life of Crime - 1990
Rebel Waltz: ‘’The Last One To Die Is a Rotten Egg’’ - 1990
The Smashing Pumpkins: Gish – 1990-1991
TAD: 8-Way Santa - 1991
The Young Fresh Fellows: Electric Bird Digest - 1991
Sky Pilot: Mike DeFoy - 1992
The Wizenhiemers: We Play For Beer - 1992
L7: Bricks Are Heavy - 1991-1992
The Rockin' Bones  Second Chance To Dance - 1991-1992 
Walt Mink: Miss Happiness - 1992
Chainsaw Kittens: Flipped Out in Singapore - 1992
Paw: Dragline – 1992
Nirvana: Incesticide − 1992 ("Dive")
Freedy Johnston: This Perfect World - 1994
Everclear: Sparkle and Fade - 1994
Soul Asylum: Let Your Dim Light Shine - 1994-1995
The GUTS: Let It Go - 2008
Garbage: Garbage - 1994-1995
Sexepil: Sugar for the Soul - 1995
Archers of Loaf: All the Nations Airports - 1996
Walt Mink: Colossus - 1996
Garbage: Version 2.0 - 1997-98
Scott Fields: Five Frozen Eggs - 1997
Rainer Maria: Look Now Look Again - 1998
The Promise Ring: Boys + Girls EP - 1998
Citizen King: Mobile Estates - 1999
Rainer Maria: A Better Version of Me - 1999
Garbage: Beautiful Garbage - 2000-2001
Rainer Maria: Ears Ring EP - 2002
Rainer Maria: Long Knives Drawn - 2003
Fall Out Boy: Take This to Your Grave - 2003
The Lovehammers: Murder on My Mind - 2003
Split Habit: Put Your Money Where Your Mouth Is - 2003
Garbage: Bleed Like Me - 2003-2004
As Tall as Lions: Lafcadio - 2004
Hawthorne Heights: The Silence in Black and White - 2004
Death Cab for Cutie: Plans - 2005
 Various Artists: Under the Radar Vol. 1 - 2006
Sparklehorse: Dreamt for Light Years in the Belly of a Mountain - 2006
Jimmy Eat World: Chase This Light - 2006-2007
Tegan and Sara: The Con - 2007
Hotel Lights: Firecracker People - 2007
The Leftovers: On the Move - 2007
Charlemange: We Can Build An Island - 2007
Death Cab for Cutie: Narrow Stairs - 2007
The Other Kids: Living in the Mirror (1985), Happy Home (1986), Grin'' (1990)
Festive Skeletons: World of Difference (1997)
Spitalfield: Better than Knowing Where You Are - 2006

Producers and engineers associated with Smart Studios

Butch Vig (founder, producer and engineer)
Steve Marker (founder, producer and engineer)
Mike Zirkel (studio manager, producer, engineer)
Chris Walla (producer, engineer)
Sean O'Keefe (producer, engineer)
Brandon Mason (producer, engineer)
Al Weatherhead (producer, engineer)
Beau Sorenson (producer, engineer)
Justin Perkins (producer, engineer)
Duke Erikson (producer and engineer)
Doug Olson (producer, engineer)

References

External links
The Smart Studios Story documentary website
Clutch Sound website

Companies based in Madison, Wisconsin
Music of Wisconsin
1983 establishments in Wisconsin
2010 disestablishments in Wisconsin
Recording studios in the United States